The 1972 Hardy Cup was the 1972 edition of the Canadian intermediate senior ice hockey championship.

Final
Best of 5
Campbellton 7 Rosetown 5
Rosetown 3 Campbellton 2
Rosetown 4 Campbellton 3
Campbellton 5 Rosetown 3
Campbellton 6 Rosetown 2

Campbellton Tigers beat Rosetown Red Wings 3–2 on series.

Eastern Playdowns

Teams
Northern Ontario: Lively Cyclones
Ottawa District: Embrun Panthers
Nova Scotia: Antigonish Bulldogs
New Brunswick: Campbellton Tigers
Newfoundland: Labrador City Carol Lakers

Playdowns

Western Playdowns

Teams
British Columbia: New Westminster Flyers
Alberta: Lloydminster Border Kings
Saskatchewan: Rosetown Red Wings
Manitoba: Warroad Lakers
Kenora: Kenora Thistles

Playdowns

External links
Hockey Canada

Hardy Cup
Hardy